is a railway station on the Seiryū Line in Iwakuni, Yamaguchi Prefecture, Japan. It is operated by the Nishikigawa Railway, a third-sector railway company.

Lines

Adjacent stations

|-
!colspan=5|Nishikigawa Railway

History
With the privatization of JNR on 1 April 1987, control of the station passed to JR West which then ceded control to Nishikigawa Railway on 25 July 1987.

Passenger statistics
In fiscal 2011, the station was used by an average of 11 passengers daily.

References

Railway stations in Japan opened in 1960
Railway stations in Yamaguchi Prefecture